Curra is a rural residential locality in the Gympie Region, Queensland, Australia.

Geography 
Curra is in the Wide Bay–Burnett region of Queensland.  It also belongs to the non-functional administrative unit known as the County of March.

The Mary River forms the western boundary, and Curra Creek is part of the northern boundary. To the east of the locality is a large portion of Curra State Forest.

The Bruce Highway passes through the locality, entering from the south-east (Bells Bridge) and exiting to the north (Gunalda).

The North Coast railway line pases through the locality, entering from the south-west (Corella) and exiting to the north (Scotchy Pocket / Gunalda) with two railway stops (from north to south):

 Curra railway station
Harvey's Siding

Curra is zoned rural/residential with working pastoral farms and small acreages.

History 

Curra (Aboriginal name 'Kurui' means grey forest possum).  The local Aboriginal tribe of the Gympie region and the Mary River Valley are the Kabi Tribe of the Kabi Kabi First Nation language group.

The first landholder owner was Walter Hay whose cattle station homestead in 1859 was named "Currie" and later changed to Curra.

During the gold rush era starting in 1867, Curra was a stopover depot at Palmer's Stockholm Hotel at the Nine Mile for travellers between Maryborough and Gympie using Cobb & Co coaches.

In 1887,  of land were resumed from the Curra pastoral run. The land was offered for selection for the establishment of small farms on 17 April 1887.

Curra Provisional School opened on 17 July 1893. On 1 January 1909 it became Curra State School. It closed in 1961. It was at approximately 6 Curra Road.

There was a mine in the Curra Estate Road area and there is a working limestone quarry.

Curra Post Office opened by 1916 (a receiving office had been open from 1892) and closed in 1977.

At the 2006 census, Curra had a population of 1,372.

Curra was once part of Shire of Tiaro but, since 2008, is within the Gympie Region local government area.

In 2012, the section of the Bruce Highway between Cooroy and Curra was considered to be one of the most dangerous of Queensland roads. 

Facilities 
A peaceful area for families and retirees with facilities such as the rural fire service; parks and playground; a post office box; Puma service station – with motel accommodation, food and groceries and a discount Pharmacy ; a community club called the Curra Country Club; and a 6 hectare block of land, council approved for hotel/motel and shops. There is an increasing amount of small businesses establishing in this area.

Education 
There are no schools in Curra. The nearest government primary schools are Gunalda State School in neighbouring Gunalda to the north and Chatsworth State School in neighbouring Chatsworth to the south. The nearest government secondary school is James Nash State High School in Gympie to the south-east.

References

External links 

 
 Community website

Gympie Region
Localities in Queensland